Pedapadu is a village in Eluru district of the Indian state of Andhra Pradesh. It is located in Pedapadu mandal.

References 
http://pedapadu.com/

Villages in Eluru district